Seiei Toyama is Japanese recipient of 2003 Ramon Magsaysay Award for Peace and International Understanding the board of trustees recognizes his twenty-year crusade to green the deserts of China in a spirit of solidarity and peace.

References

Ramon Magsaysay Award winners